Chetoptilia is a genus of flies in the family Tachinidae.

Species
Chetoptilia angustifrons Mensil, 1953
Chetoptilia cyanea Mesnil, 1968
Chetoptilia metallica Mesnil, 1968
Chetoptilia plumicornis Villeneuve, 1942
Chetoptilia puella (Rondani, 1862

References

Dexiinae
Diptera of Europe
Diptera of Asia
Diptera of Africa
Tachinidae genera
Taxa named by Camillo Rondani